Gregory Mario Ward Jr. (born July 12, 1995) is an American football wide receiver for the Philadelphia Eagles of the National Football League (NFL). He played college football at Houston as a quarterback, and converted to wide receiver after going undrafted following his college career. He was a member of the Eagles' practice squad in 2017 when they won Super Bowl LII. He also played for the San Antonio Commanders of the Alliance of American Football (AAF) in 2019.

Early years
Gregory Mario Ward Jr. was born and raised in Tyler, Texas. One of four children, Ward grew up in a "modest ranch house." Ward's father worked as a truck driver and Pentecostal pastor.

Ward graduated from John Tyler High School in 2013. As a senior, he passed for 4,202 yards, 39 touchdowns along  with 861 rushing yards and 13 touchdowns, and also won Player of the Year in Texas High School football. As a junior, he threw for 3,596 yards and 32 touchdowns and rushed for 1,212 yards with 18 touchdowns. He played wide receiver his sophomore year and recorded 53 receptions for 667 yards with eight touchdowns. Ward was rated as a three-star recruit and committed to the University of Houston to play college football.

College career

As a true freshman at Houston in 2013, Ward appeared in 10 games as a backup quarterback and wide receiver. He passed for 310 yards with a passing touchdown, rushed for 176 yards with two touchdowns and had 95 receiving yards and a touchdown. Ward started his sophomore year as a starting wide receiver, recording 15 receptions for 139 yards and a touchdown. In October, Ward took over as the starting quarterback, replacing the benched John O'Korn. He started the final eight games, completing 177-of-263 passes for 2,010 yards and 12 touchdowns. He also added 573 rushing yards with six touchdowns. Ward remained Houston's starter his junior year in 2015. He was named the MVP of the 2015 American Athletic Conference Football Championship Game after rushing for 148 yards and two touchdowns. On December 31, 2015, Ward helped the Cougars win the Chick-fil-A Peach Bowl against No. 9 Florida State and was named Offensive Player of the Game.

College statistics

Professional career

Philadelphia Eagles
Ward signed with the Philadelphia Eagles as an undrafted free agent on May 11, 2017. He was waived on September 2, 2017 and was signed to the Eagles' practice squad the next day. He was released on September 12, 2017, and was re-signed to the practice squad on September 18. While Ward was on their practice squad, the Eagles defeated the New England Patriots in Super Bowl LII.

Ward signed a reserve/future contract with the Eagles on February 7, 2018. On September 1, 2018, he was waived by the Eagles and was signed to the practice squad the next day. He was released on September 7, 2018.

San Antonio Commanders
On January 1, 2019, Ward signed with the San Antonio Commanders of the AAF. He recorded 22 receptions for 214 yards in the eight games the league lasted.

Philadelphia Eagles (second stint)

After the AAF suspended football operations, Ward re-signed with the Eagles for one year on April 9, 2019. He was waived during final roster cuts on August 31, 2019, but was re-signed to the team's practice squad the next day. He was promoted to the team's active roster on September 21, following injuries to DeSean Jackson and Alshon Jeffery. He made his NFL debut in a week 3 game against the Detroit Lions, but was waived again on September 24. He re-signed to the team's practice squad again on September 26. He was promoted to the active roster again on November 23, 2019. He caught six passes in the Eagles 17-9 loss to the Seattle Seahawks, totaling 40 yards. In Week 15 against the Washington Redskins, Ward  caught seven passes for 61 yards and his first touchdown of his NFL career in the Eagles' 37–27 win against the Redskins. Ward finished the 2019 season with 28 receptions for 254 yards. 

In week 3 of the 2020 season against the Cincinnati Bengals, Ward caught 8 passes for 72 yards and a touchdown in the 23-23 tie. In Week 13 against the Green Bay Packers, Ward caught the first career touchdown pass thrown by rookie quarterback Jalen Hurts during the 30–16 loss. In week 15 against the Arizona Cardinals, Ward caught 4 passes including 2 touchdowns in the 33-26 loss. Ward finished the 2020 season with 53 receptions for 419 receiving yards and six receiving touchdowns in 16 games.

Ward signed a one-year exclusive-rights free agent tender with the Eagles on March 29, 2021. In 2021, Ward took a reserve role in the receiving corps after the Eagles drafted DeVonta Smith. He ended the season with 7 catches for 95 yards and 3 touchdowns, and he was used in trick plays as a passer, ultimately completing one pass for 2 yards.

While he initially wasn't tendered by the Eagles in the 2022 offseason, Ward signed a new one-year deal with the team on March 15. He was placed on injured reserve on August 30, 2022. He was released on September 9. On October 24, he was brought back to the practice squad.

NFL career statistics

Regular season

Postseason

References

External links
Philadelphia Eagles bio
Houston Cougars bio

1995 births
Living people
Sportspeople from Tyler, Texas
Players of American football from Texas
American football quarterbacks
American football wide receivers
Houston Cougars football players
Philadelphia Eagles players
San Antonio Commanders players